Shake Your Powder Puff is a 1934 Warner Bros. Merrie Melodies cartoon directed by Friz Freleng. The short was released on October 17, 1934.

Plot
A bunch of animals are putting on performances in a barn. When a dog gets thrown out, he plots revenge.

Notes
 This short is the first Looney Tunes/Merrie Melodies short to have a "That's All Folks" gag. In this short, the dog appears walking and shouted the familiar "That's All Folks" line to the viewers until a squash was thrown straight at the dog's face.

References

External links
 

1934 films
1934 animated films
Films scored by Bernard B. Brown
Films scored by Norman Spencer (composer)
Short films directed by Friz Freleng
Buddy (Looney Tunes) films
Merrie Melodies short films
Warner Bros. Cartoons animated short films
American black-and-white films
1930s Warner Bros. animated short films
1930s English-language films